Liguus fasciatus, the Liguus Tree Snails, also known as "living jewels", is a species of air-breathing land snail, a tree snail, a terrestrial pulmonate gastropod mollusk in the family Orthalicidae.

Subspecies 
In Florida this species includes the following 52 varieties or color forms, while in Cuba it is present in more than 70 varieties.

Liguus fasciatus alternatus
Liguus fasciatus aurantius
Liguus fasciatus barbouri
Liguus fasciatus capensis

Liguus fasciatus goodrichiLiguus fasciatus castaneozonatusLiguus fasciatus castaneusLiguus fasciatus cingulatusLiguus fasciatus clenchiLiguus fasciatus crasusLiguus fasciatus deckertiLiguus fasciatus delicatusLiguus fasciatus dohertyiLiguus fasciatus dryasLiguus fasciatus eburneusLiguus fasciatus elegansLiguus fasciatus elliottensisLiguus fasciatus floridanusLiguus fasciatus fuscoflamellusLiguus fasciatus farnumiLiguus fasciatus gloryasylvaticusLiguus fasciatus graphicusLiguus fasciatus innominatusLiguus fasciatus lignumvitaeLiguus fasciatus lineolatusLiguus fasciatus livingstoniLiguus fasciatus lossmanicusLiguus fasciatus lucidovariusLiguus fasciatus luteusLiguus fasciatus marmoratusLiguus fasciatus matecumbensisLiguus fasciatus miammiensisLiguus fasciatus mosieriLiguus fasciatus nebulosusLiguus fasciatus ornatusLiguus fasciatus osmentiLiguus fasciatus pictusLiguus fasciatus pseudopictusLiguus fasciatus roseatusLiguus fasciatus septentrionalisLiguus fasciatus simpsoniLiguus fasciatus solidulusLiguus fasciatus solicoccasusLiguus fasciatus splendidusLiguus fasciatus subcrenatusLiguus fasciatus testudineus Liguus fasciatus vacaensisLiguus fasciatus versicolorLiguus fasciatus violafumosusLiguus fasciatus walkeriLiguus fasciatus winteiLiguus fasciatus solidusLiguus fasciatus vonpaulseniDescription
 Shells of Liguus fasciatus can reach a size of .Florida Fish and Wildlife Conservation Commission These polished shining shells, ranging from white to almost black, have whorls banded with many colors (chestnut, orange, yellow pink or green).

These tree snails feed on fungus and algae scraped from the bark of the host plants (mainly wild tamarind (Lysiloma latisiliquum), pigeon plum (Coccoloba diversifolia) and Myrsine'' species). They can be found mainly from May through September, but they are active throughout the year.

Distribution 
This species is the most widespread of all the Liguus. It occurs in the Caribbean Area (South Florida. Florida Keys, North coast of Cuba, Isle of Pines).

Habitat
These tree snails can be found in southern Florida on hammocks, tropical forest and shrubs habitats that are slightly higher in elevation than the surrounding area.

Gallery

References

Further reading 
 Bennetts,  R. E.,  D. Jansen, and S. A. Sparks.  2000. Factors influencing movement probabilities of Florida tree snails (Liguus fasciatus) in Big Cypress National Preserve following Hurricane Andrew. Malacologia 42:31-37.
 Bennetts,  R. E.,  S. A. Sparks, and D. Jansen.  2000. Host-tree selection by Florida tree snails (Liguus faciatus) in Big Cypress National Preserve.  Nautilus 114:112-116.

External links 
 The Florida Tree Snail (Liguus fasciatus)
 photo of shells of Liguus fasciatus
 Bram's Snail Site

Orthalicidae
Gastropods described in 1774
Taxa named by Otto Friedrich Müller